Mickey, Donald, Goofy: The Three Musketeers is a 2004 American animated direct-to-video musical adventure comedy film based on the film adaptations of the 1844 novel The Three Musketeers by Alexandre Dumas and the Mickey Mouse film series by Walt Disney and Ub Iwerks. As the title suggests, it features Mickey Mouse, Donald Duck, and Goofy as the three musketeers in their first full length feature film together. This film was directed by Donovan Cook, produced by Walt Disney Pictures and the Australian office of DisneyToon Studios. It was released directly to VHS and DVD on August 17, 2004 by Walt Disney Home Entertainment, and was later re-released on Blu-ray Disc on August 12, 2014, coinciding with the film's 10th anniversary. The film received mixed to positive reviews from critics, who praised its musical numbers, action sequences and faithfulness to the original material, but were mixed on certain aspects and elements.

Plot
Troubadour, a French-accented turtle, inadvertently injures the storyteller just before a live broadcast. Troubadour is hastily made to take the storyteller’s place, takes out his comic book, and tells the audience his favored version of The Three Musketeers.

In 17th century France, street urchins Mickey Mouse, Donald Duck, Goofy, and Pluto, are one day harassed by the Beagle Boys; but are saved by royal musketeers. Mickey is gifted one of their hats, inspiring him and his friends to follow their example and become musketeers themselves. Years later, the trio are employed as janitors at the musketeers' headquarters, headed by Captain Pete. Pete mocks the trio’s desire to become musketeers, deeming them all too unfit for the job in addition to that, the three of them don’t do any of the janitorial jobs correctly without messing it up and always end up destroying parts the headquarters. They are ordered to work in the laundry dungeon as punishment.

Meanwhile, Princess Minnie narrowly avoids a large safe being dropped on her by the Beagle Boys. Captain Pete, revealed to be their boss, chastises them for attempting to assassinate her, as he wants her kidnapped so that he can take over the kingdom on the night of the Opera. In response to the attempt on her life, Minnie summons Pete, demanding he produce musketeer bodyguards to protect her. Pete realises that with experienced musketeers his plan will thwart but after witnessing yet another disaster, he decides to falsely recruit the incompetent Mickey, Donald, and Goofy as musketeers, elating the trio. Minnie falls in love with Mickey at first sight.

While on a carriage ride, the Beagle Boys ambush Mickey, Donald, and Goofy, easily defeat them, and kidnap Minnie and her lady-in-waiting, Daisy. Mickey encourages his friends to not lose hope, and they all hurry to rescue Minnie and Daisy from an abandoned tower. Goofy rushes in first, running up all the stairs and out a window into a series of events that catapults him back into the tower. The musketeers then engage the Beagle Boys in another fight. Donald hides, leaving Mickey and Goofy cornered, but Goofy manages to come up with an idea to jump out the window with Mickey to engage the same events as before in order to force the bandits out of the tower and into the river. Minnie and Daisy are rescued, and Minnie and Mickey spend time together and fall deeper in love.

Pete realizes that the trio is more of a threat than he originally anticipated, so he plans to get rid of them individually. While on night patrol, Goofy is lured away from the palace by Pete’s lieutenant, Clarabelle. Donald is chased by the Beagle Boys and delivered to Pete, who reveals his true nature after trapping him in a guillotine, though Donald manages to escape. Donald returns to the palace to inform Mickey what happened. While Mickey chooses to remain and stop Pete, Donald is too frightened and abandons him. Pete then ambushes Mickey, locks him in a dungeon at Mont Saint-Michel, and leaves him to die when the tide comes in to flood the cell.

Meanwhile, Clarabelle is about to kill Goofy by throwing him into the Seine. However, the two instantly become smitten with one another, and Clarabelle has a change of heart. Clarabelle informs Goofy that Mickey is in danger. Pluto leads Goofy to Mickey’s location, with Donald being dragged along. When Donald refuses to help save Mickey, Troubadour musically berates Donald for his cowardice, angering him into going with Goofy. The duo narrowly saves Mickey. When Mickey despairs that their status as musketeers was a lie, Goofy encourages him by stating that despite their flaws, there is nothing they can't accomplish while together. Rejuvenated, Mickey leads his friends to stop Pete and save the princess.

At the theater, Pete and the Beagle Boys then capture Minnie and Daisy, imprisoning them in a chest. One of the Beagle Boys impersonates Minnie and announces Pete as the new king of France to the public. Mickey, Donald, and Goofy arrive and battle Pete and the Beagle Boys onstage. Mickey, Donald, and Goofy come together and overpower Pete, allowing them to rescue Minnie and Daisy, who profess their love for Mickey and Donald, respectively. Minnie later officially dubs Mickey, Donald, and Goofy as royal musketeers, fulfilling their dream.

Voice cast
 Wayne Allwine as Mickey Mouse
 Tony Anselmo as Donald Duck
 Bill Farmer as Goofy and Pluto
 Russi Taylor as Minnie Mouse
 Tress MacNeille as Daisy Duck
 Jim Cummings as Captain Pete
 April Winchell as Clarabelle Cow
 Jeff Bennett and Maurice LaMarche as The Beagle Boys
 Rob Paulsen as Troubadour
 Jess Harnell as Major General
 Frank Welker as Additional Voices
 Trevor Devall as Pirate Crew (Singing voice)

Production 
An adaptation of Alexandre Dumas's The Three Musketeers, with Mickey Mouse, Donald Duck, and Goofy as the Musketeers; was planned during the 1980s at Walt Disney Animation Studios. In 1983, storyboard artists Steve Hulett and Pete Young developed the project with Mickey Mouse, Donald Duck, Goofy, and José Carioca as the Musketeers, but it fell into development hell. In 2002, in honor of Mickey Mouse's 75th anniversary, it was announced that a featurette entitled The Search of Mickey Mouse was in development. The project was about Mickey who gets kidnapped by unknown forces, forcing Minnie Mouse to enlist Basil of Baker Street to investigate his disappearance, and later encounters one character from Disney's animated film canon such as Alice, Peter Pan, Robin Hood, and Aladdin. However, the project suffered script problems with the multiple cameos being thought to be too gimmicky. After the cancellation of the latter project it was announced that a feature film based on The Three Musketeers with Mickey, Donald, and Goofy in the lead roles was in development, meaning that Hulett's and Young's project had been revived. However, the film did not include José Carioca as in the early development.

Reception
, Mickey, Donald, Goofy: The Three Musketeers had a rating of 36% on review aggregator Rotten Tomatoes based on 11 reviews with an average score of 4.84/10.

Release
The film was first released on DVD and VHS on August 17, 2004. For the film's 10th anniversary, it was released on Blu-ray on August 12, 2014.

Video games
A world named Country of the Musketeers based on the movie appears in Kingdom Hearts 3D: Dream Drop Distance. This is the first time a world in the series has originated from a direct-to-video feature. Like the Timeless River world in Kingdom Hearts II, it is featured as a period of Mickey Mouse's past. All the characters except Daisy, Clarabelle, and the Troubadour appear.

Soundtrack

The soundtrack for the film, titled Mickey, Donald & Goofy: The Three Musketeers, was released on August 13, 2004, by Walt Disney Records. In addition to seven classical songs reinterpreted with new comedic lyrics, it also features a rewritten cover of the Schoolhouse Rock classic "Three Is a Magic Number" by Stevie Brock, Greg Raposo and Matt Ballinger.
In 2018, "Mickey, Donald and Goofy: The Three Musketeers" became the first direct-to-video Disney film to have its full musical score, released on CD by Intrada Records. 
Like the original album, Intrada's release includes all the songs from the movie, though in this release, most of them are put together with the respective pieces of Bruce Broughton's background music that leads up to them. 
Some of the music cues include pieces of the score that ultimately went unused in the movie. The "Three is a Magic Number" cover is also omitted this time.

References

External links

 
 
 

2004 direct-to-video films
2004 animated films
2004 action comedy films
2000s adventure comedy films
2000s comedy thriller films
2000s parody films
2000s American animated films
American action comedy films
American adventure comedy films
American children's animated action films
American children's animated adventure films
American children's animated comedy films
American children's animated musical films
American romantic musical films
American romantic comedy films
Animated films about cats
Animated films about ducks
Animated films about dogs
Animated films about turtles
Animated films set in France
Animated romance films
Animated thriller films
DisneyToon Studios animated films
Disney direct-to-video animated films
Mickey Mouse films
Goofy (Disney) films
Donald Duck films
Films scored by Bruce Broughton
Films based on The Three Musketeers
Films directed by Donovan Cook
Films with screenplays by David Mickey Evans
Films with screenplays by Evan Spiliotopoulos
Films set in the 17th century
2000s English-language films
American direct-to-video films